Arius leptonotacanthus is a species of sea catfish in the family Ariidae. It was described by Pieter Bleeker in 1849. It is known from tropical brackish and marine waters in the western Pacific.

References

Ariidae
Taxa named by Pieter Bleeker
Fish described in 1849